Premakke Sai is a 2001 Indian Kannada-language romantic comedy film directed by A. Kodandarami Reddy which marked his debut in Kannada films. The film was produced by C. Ashwini Dutt. The film stars  V. Ravichandran, Shaheen Khan, Prakash Rai and Kasthuri.

The film was a remake of Telugu film Chiru Navvutho (2000) directed by G. Ram Prasad and written by Trivikram Srinivas. The film was also remade in Tamil as Youth (2002). The music was composed by Mani Sharma who composed for the other two languages as well.

Cast 

 V. Ravichandran as Venu
 Shaheen Khan as Sandhya
 Prakash Raj
 Kasthuri as Vedha
 Srinath
 Sihi Kahi Chandru
 Sadhu Kokila
 Ramesh Bhat
 Sanketh Kashi
 Malathi
 Padma Vasanthi
 Bhavyasri Rai

Soundtrack 
The music was composed by Mani Sharma and lyrics written by K. Kalyan. A total of 7 tracks have been composed for the film and the audio rights brought by Ashwini Audio. The song "Premada Lokada" is based on "Yeh Mera Jahan" from Kushi. The songs "Olavu", "Santhosha Sambrama" and "Anda Nin Hesara" were retained from original Telugu film Chiru Navvuto. The song "Chanchala" was later remade by Sharma as "Malligai Malligai" for Tamil film Arasu and as "Chinnaga" for Telugu film Tagore.

References

External links 

 

2001 films
2000s Kannada-language films
Indian romance films
Kannada remakes of Telugu films
Films directed by A. Kodandarami Reddy
2000s romance films